Bauer Financial (stylized as BauerFinancial) is a financial rating agency based in Coral Gables, Florida. Karen L. Dorway is the president of Bauer Financial.

History
Bauer Financial was founded in 1983, in Coral Gables, Florida, by Paul A. Bauer. In 2000, the company changed its name from The Bauer Group to Bauer Financial.

Structure
Bauer Financial provides depositor-focused ratings of banks and credit unions in the United States. The company's rating scale runs from zero to five stars, the strongest institution being granted five-star ratings.

References

External links
Official site

Financial services companies established in 1983
Financial services companies of the United States